Rives Dervoises is a commune in the Haute-Marne department of northeastern France. The municipality was established on 1 January 2016 and consists of the former communes of Droyes, Longeville-sur-la-Laines, Louze and Puellemontier.

See also 
Communes of the Haute-Marne department

References 

Communes of Haute-Marne